Frank Smythson Limited, commonly known as Smythson, is a British manufacturer and retailer of luxury stationery, leather goods, diaries, and fashion products based in London, England. The company's founder, Frank John Smythson, was born in 1847 at Holborn and was a son of Marcus Alfred Smythson, a professor of music. He opened his first store on 29 September 1887 at 133 New Bond Street in London. Smythson's current flagship store is located nearby at 131-132 New Bond Street.

Smythson's clients have included the current British royal family, Queen Victoria, many UK politicians and prime ministers, Sir Edmund Hillary, Madonna, and Grace Kelly. In 1908, the company created the first 'Featherweight' diary, enabling diaries to be carried about. Most of the company's leather goods are now made in Italy.

Locations
In the United Kingdom, in addition to the flagship store on New Bond Street, Smythson has London boutiques on Sloane Street, Westbourne Grove , as well as concessions in Harrods, Selfridges and Heathrow Terminals 4 and 5. 

Smythson's other international location is at Le Bon Marché in Paris.

The New Bond Street store hosts a small archive collection dedicated to notable users of Smythson products throughout the brand's history.

History
In the 1950s, the John Menzies Group acquired Smythson, which was also operating under the name 'Pendragon' at the time. In 1998, Smythson's then managing director Sarah Elton led a management buyout backed by a private investor. Since then, the business has grown and the company is now operating outlets in the UK, US and France, as well as online through their website. In 2004, Smythson recorded £12 million in sales revenues.

In early 2005, Smythson shareholders appointed Cavendish Corporate Finance Limited to advise on the disposal of their stake in the business. Besides maximising value for themselves, the shareholders wanted to find a buyer who would protect the heritage of the brand and offer the management team the opportunity to continue to grow.

Kelso Place Asset Management and King Street Partners, backed by a consortium of high-net-worth individuals, were identified as the preferred bidders. Sarah Elton commented that she was satisfied with the deal.

In mid-December 2009, the company was sold for £18 million to Greenwill SA. Jacques Bahbout became Chairman of Smythson. In 2021, Stefano Giacomelli was appointed Deputy Chairman.

In recent years, Smythson has done a number of collaborations with a range of artists and designers such as Holly Fulton in 2010, Jonathan Saunders in 2011, Quentin Jones in 2014, and Coco Capitán in 2020.

References

External links
Official website

British brands
Luxury brands
High fashion brands